Xiagu Danxin is a wuxia novel by Liang Yusheng first published as a serial between 5 October 1967 and 20 June 1969 in the Hong Kong newspaper Sin Wan Pao. Considered the tenth part of the Tianshan series of novels by Liang Yusheng, it serves as a sequel to Yunhai Yugong Yuan and is closely related to two other novels – Binghe Xijian Lu and Fenglei Zhen Jiuzhou – in the series.

Plot 
The novel is set in the late 18th century or early 19th century in China during the Qing dynasty. 20 years ago, Jin Shiyi had retired from the jianghu (martial artists' community) and settled on a remote island with his wife, Gu Zhihua. Their son, Jin Zhuliu, who has inherited his parents' skills, disguises himself as a beggar and roams the jianghu in search of adventure. He saves and befriends Qin Yuanhao of the Wudang School; defeats the imperial guard commander Wen Daozhuang; foils an assassination attempt on his father's apprentice, Jiang Haitian; and becomes famous in the jianghu for his heroic deeds.

Shi Baidu, the chief of the Six Harmonies Gang, pledges allegiance to Safuding, a high-ranking Manchu aristocrat – much to the disapproval of his fellows in the jianghu who are opposed to the Qing government. He intends to present lavish gifts to Safuding at the latter's 60th birthday party, but a string of pearls he prepared is stolen by his subordinate. The xuantie, a precious piece of metal regarded as a sacred artefact of the Six Harmonies Gang, is stolen by Jin Zhuliu and Shi Hongying, Shi Baidu's sister. When they first met, Jin Zhuliu and Shi Hanging were hostile towards each other but they gradually develop a romantic relationship after their various encounters. Jin Zhuliu also meets Li Nanxing, a grandnephew of Li Shengnan, the deceased leader of the disbanded Heavenly Demonic Cult, and becomes sworn brothers with him. They join forces with Yuchi Jiong and his wife to create havoc at Safuding's birthday party and rob him of several precious items.

Shi Baidu pretends to arrange for a marriage between Shi Hongying and Shuai Mengxiong, a general leading imperial forces to suppress a rebellion in Xichang, while secretly planning to lure Li Nanxing into a trap. Mistakenly thinking that Shi Hongying loves Li Nanxing, Jin Zhuliu feels heartbroken and wants to leave. However, after he learns of the trap set by Shi Baidu, he rushes to save Li Nanxing, who is injured but rescued by Gongsun Yan, the daughter of Gongsun Hong, the leader of the Red Tassel Society. While recovering from his injuries, Li Nanxing develops a romance with Gongsun Yan.

Even though his plan has failed, Shi Baidu still insists on forcing Shi Hongying to marry Shuai Mengxiong. On the wedding day, Jin Zhuliu, Li Nanxing, Gongsun Yan and their allies show up in Xichang, disrupt the wedding and defeat Shuai Mengxiong and his forces. Shi Baidu meets his downfall and commits suicide in shame, while Shi Hongying becomes the new chief of the Six Harmonies Gang and pledges to support the rebels in resisting the Qing government.

During the battle at Xichang, Li Nanxing and Gongsun Yan accidentally fall off a cliff together and are presumed dead. In the meantime, some jianghu lowlifes led by Yang Hao reestablish the Heavenly Demonic Cult in Li Nanxing's name and commit several atrocities. Jin Zhuliu is surprised to hear that his sworn brother, whom he thought had died, is alive and has become a villain. He refuses to believe the rumours so he infiltrates the cult to investigate. During this time, he encounters Li Nanxing, who has survived the fall. They discover that Yang Hao has found someone to impersonate Li Nanxing and pledged allegiance to the Qing government. Jin Zhuliu, Li Nanxing and their allies clash with Yang Hao and his supporters at the cult's headquarters and defeat them. The cult is disbanded again and the majority of its members join the rebels. Around the same time, Jin Zhuliu's parents return to the mainland and defeat seven highly skilled martial artists from Fusang.

When there are news that Safuding has contacted five tribal chiefs in Qinghai to support him in attacking the rebels in Xichang, Jin Zhuliu volunteers to travel to Xichang to warn the rebels and stop the tribal chiefs from siding with Safuding, and succeeds in his mission. In the end, Jin Zhuliu marries Shi Hongying while Li Nanxing marries Gongsun Yan, with blessings from the jianghu.

Adaptations 
In 1971, the novel was adapted into a Hong Kong film titled The Patriotic Knights, produced by Great Wall Movie Enterprises and directed by Chang Hsin-yen.

In 2006, the novel was adapted into a Chinese television series titled The Patriotic Knights, starring Chen Long as Jin Zhuliu, Stephanie Hsiao as Shi Hongying, Wallace Chung as Li Nanxing and He Meitian as Gongsun Yan (renamed Zhong Yanyan in the series). Unlike the novel which is set in the Qing dynasty, the television series is set in the late Ming dynasty with Wei Zhongxian replacing Safuding as the primary villain.

References 

Novels by Liang Yusheng
Novels set in the Qing dynasty